The Suzuki A100 is a motorcycle produced by Suzuki Motor Corporation starting in 1966.

Engine 
The Suzuki A100 is powered by a  rotary valve two-stroke single cylinder, air-cooled engine. The bore and stroke are each 50mm. The compression ratio is 6.5:1.
The engine produces 9.5 hp at 7500 rpm and 6.87 lb ft of torque at 6500 rpm

Fuelling 
The Suzuki A100 is fitted with a single Mikuni VM 20 SC carburetor.

In contrast to a traditional two stroke engine where the induction of fuel is controlled only by the piston covering and uncovering ports in the wall of the cylinder, the A100 utilizes a rotary valve system. This consists of a steel disk with windows cut into it attached to the crankshaft, which covers and uncovers an port machined into the engine casing. This allows for more precise controlling of when in the combustion cycle fuel and air is inducted into the combustion chamber.

Lubrication
According to the Suzuki A100 Service Manual, the A100 features the Suzuki C.C.I . (Crankcase-Cylinder-Injection) lubrication system. Instead of mixing two stroke oil with the gasoline, oil is supplied into two points in the crankcase, one of which is through a main bearing. For this reason premix cannot be run long term, as this will eventually cause the bearing to fail. The amount of oil being pumped at a given time is a function of both the engine speed and the throttle position. The oil pump a Mukini manufactured pump. Benefits of using the Suzuki C.C.I. system instead of premixing gasoline with oil include: reduction of two-stroke smoke, elimination of the need to premix the gasoline and oil, reduction in carbon buildup, and reduction in oil usage. 
Suzuki recommends using Suzuki C.C.I. two stroke oil for the engine.

Transmission 
The transmission utilizes a 4-speed constant mesh gearbox and a wet multi-plate clutch. The Suzuki A100 Haynes manual lists the transmission gear ratios as follows:

The final chain drive ratio is 2.46:1 accomplished through the use of a 32 and 13 tooth sprocket.
The transmission is filled with 650cc of motor oil.  Suzuki recommends using SAE 20W40 motor oil for the transmission.

Frame 
The monocoque frame of the A100 motorcycle is made of pressed steel halves welded together down the center.

Electrical 
The motorcycle uses a 6V electrical system to run the headlight, tail light, signal lights, brake light, horn and tail light. The headlight is AC whereas the other lights are DC powered. Bikes built for the Canadian and US markets have an ignition switch to force the headlight to be on whilst the motorcycle is running.

Reception 
In a comparison of the Suzuki A100, Kawasaki KH100, and Yamaha RS100 in the September 1976 issue, Bike magazine praised the durability, serviceability and practicality of the A100 as a commuter machine. However, it was given 3rd place in the comparison. The article concludes, "It's not that the Suzuki is a bad machine, just that the Kawasaki and the Yamaha provide the same commuting qualities, plus a genuine motorcycling experience." At the time the article was written, the Suzuki A100 could be purchased for £295.

A road test of the A100 in Motorcycle Mechanics Magazine published in 1973 also noted that the A100 was well suited as a runabout but lacked some performance. The magazine specifically called out the suspension system and braking performance as weak points of the motorcycle while praising its oil tightness and overall engine design and performance.

References

A100
Motorcycles introduced in 1966
Two-stroke motorcycles